Charles Edward Hanna (17 May 1884 – 10 October 1932) was a Liberal party member of the House of Commons of Canada. He was born in Belleville, Ontario and became a merchant in the hardware business.

Hanna was a municipal politician in Belleville, three years as an alderman and two years as mayor, and a member of the board of education.

He was elected to Parliament at the Hastings West riding in a by-election on 25 November 1924. After completing the remainder of the term of the 14th Canadian Parliament, Hanna sought re-election at Hastings South but was defeated by William Ernest Tummon of the Conservatives in the 1925 federal election. Hanna also made an unsuccessful campaign to unseat Tummon in the 1930 election.

References

External links
 

1884 births
1932 deaths
Canadian merchants
Liberal Party of Canada MPs
Mayors of Belleville, Ontario
Members of the House of Commons of Canada from Ontario
Ontario municipal councillors